McConnell Lake may refer to:

McConnell Lake Provincial Park, British Columbia, Canada
McConnell Lake (British Columbia), near the city of Kamloops
McConnell Lake (Ontario), Kenora District, Canada
McConnell Lake (Yukon), near Whitehorse, Yukon, Canada

See also
Lake McConnell, a former lake in what is now Canada
Lake McConnell (Texas), Gray County, Texas, United States